Adelbert Carl "Del" Marsh (born September 2, 1956) is a Republican member of the Alabama Senate, representing the 12th District since 1998. He defeated Democratic challenger Judge Wallace Wyatt in the 2010 midterm elections. The next day, he was chosen as President pro tempore of the Alabama State Senate by his colleagues. Since the succession of Kay Ivey to the position of Governor of Alabama on April 10, 2017, until January 14, 2019, the office of lieutenant governor was vacant.

Career
In May 2019, he voted to make abortion a crime at any stage in a pregnancy, with no exemptions for cases of rape or incest.

In May 2019, he co-sponsored a bill to change Alabama's ethics laws to allow lobbyists to give unlimited gifts to lawmakers. Also on the bill were measures to decriminalize bribery and to redefine key terms of the ethics laws in order to loosen their power to prevent corruption.

In May 2020, during the COVID-19 pandemic, Marsh proposed using $200 million of CARES Act relief for the building of a new state house. $1.8 billion was given to the Alabama state government to be used for expenditures caused by the pandemic.

References

External links
Alabama State Legislature – Senator Del Marsh official government website
Project Vote Smart – Senator Del Marsh (AL) profile
Follow the Money – Del Marsh
2006 2002 1998 campaign contributions

|-

1956 births
21st-century American politicians
Republican Party Alabama state senators
Auburn University alumni
Living people
Politicians from Anniston, Alabama
Politicians from Wheeling, West Virginia